Sexhelm of Lindisfarne was Bishop of Lindisfarne for six months, but the year is unknown.

Sexhelm was probably the Sexhelm mentioned in Walter Scott's Marmion:

Was by the prelate Sexhelm made
A place of burial for such dead
As, having died in mortal sin,
Might not be laid the church within.

Citations

References

External links
 
 Canto II of Walter Scott's Marmion

Bishops of Lindisfarne
10th-century English bishops
Year of birth unknown